Zitadelle is a station on the Berlin U-Bahn line U7. It was opened on 1 October 1984 with the line's extension from Rohrdamm to Rathaus Spandau. Its name means "Citadel" in English and it was named for the historic Spandau Citadel. Unlike most U-Bahn stations, Zitadelle has side platforms.
The station's interiors were also designed to resemble the citadel's style.

It lies between the stations Altstadt Spandau and Haselhorst.
It was built/opened by R.G.Rümmler in 1984 (planned was the name "Am Juliusturm"). This station has side platforms because during its construction the important street above could not be blocked. So first the northern platform was built then the southern.
The next station is Haselhorst.

References

External links

U7 (Berlin U-Bahn) stations
Buildings and structures in Spandau
Railway stations in Germany opened in 1984